Roman Brown Geoffrey (born 26 February 1982 in Karasburg, ǁKaras Region) is a Namibian international footballer with Ramblers F.C.

Professional career
 Orlando Pirates F.C. Windhoek (1998–2000)
 African Stars F.C. (2001–2003)
 Germania Dattenfeld (2003)
 MSV Duisburg (2003/2004)
 Rot-Weiß Oberhausen (2004/2005)

International career
Geoffrey is former member of the Namibia national football team. Geoffrey has 12 caps with the Brave Warriors senior squad.

References

1982 births
Living people
People from ǁKaras Region
Namibian men's footballers
Namibia international footballers
Association football forwards
Namibian expatriate sportspeople in Germany
Expatriate footballers in Germany
African Stars F.C. players
Namibian expatriate footballers
Orlando Pirates S.C. players
F.C. Civics Windhoek players